Stade Rochelais Charente-Maritime Women Cycling is a professional road bicycle racing women's team which participates in elite women's races. The team was established in 2015 becoming a UCI Women's Team for the 2019 season.

Team roster

Major results
2019
La Picto-Charentaise, Gladys Verhulst

National Champions
2015
 Portugal Time Trial, Daniela Reis
 Portugal Road Race, Daniela Reis

2016
 Portugal Time Trial, Daniela Reis
 Portugal Road Race, Daniela Reis

References

External links

UCI Women's Teams
Cycling teams based in France
Cycling teams established in 2015